Eucithara pagoda is a small sea snail, a marine gastropod mollusk in the family Mangeliidae.

Distribution
This marine species is endemic to Australia and occurs off Tasmania.

References

External links
  Tucker, J.K. 2004 Catalog of recent and fossil turrids (Mollusca: Gastropoda). Zootaxa 682:1-1295.
  Hedley, C. 1922. A revision of the Australian Turridae. Records of the Australian Museum 13(6): 213-359, pls 42-56

pagoda
Gastropods described in 1910
Gastropods of Australia